Caryl J. Kristensen (née McKellogg; born November 23, 1960) is an American businessperson and former comedian who was one-half of the comedy troupe The Mommies.  The duo had a half-hour sitcom, called The Mommies, that ran from 1993–1995 and a daytime talk show, Caryl & Marilyn: Real Friends, which ran during the 1996–1997 season.

Kristensen, the ninth of eleven children, graduated from Rosary High School in Fullerton, California in 1978 and California State University, Chico with a degree in graphic design. She is married to contractor Len Kristensen; they have two sons, Eric and Bryce.

Post-comedy career
From 2004 to 2011, Kristensen was a college counselor at Campbell Hall School. Since 2009, Kristensen has been chief operating officer of video interview service ZipIntro.

References

External links
Official site of The Mommies
 

1960 births
Living people
People from Fullerton, California
California State University, Chico alumni
Loyola Marymount University alumni
University of California, Los Angeles alumni
American women comedians
Comedians from California
American chief operating officers
21st-century American comedians
21st-century American women